Chase De Leo (born October 25, 1995) is an American professional ice hockey forward for the San Diego Gulls of the American Hockey League (AHL), while under contract with the Anaheim Ducks in the National Hockey League (NHL).

Personal life
De Leo was born on October 25, 1995, in La Mirada, California, U.S. to parents John and Janie who own a wholesale plumbing supply company. De Leo originally played baseball before being convinced to take up roller hockey due to his mom finding the former sport boring.

De Leo played roller hockey for the Orange County Blades before transitioned to ice hockey. He began playing as a goaltender for the Norwalk Knights before switching positions. As a youth, De Leo played for the Los Angeles Selects minor ice hockey team, where he was a teammate of Eric Comrie. While playing with this team,  De Leo competed in the 2008 Quebec International Pee-Wee Hockey Tournament. After meeting Joe Sakic, Peter Forsberg, and Patrick Roy, De Leo chose to pursue ice hockey as a career.

Playing career
De Leo played junior ice hockey for the Western Hockey League's Portland Winterhawks from 2011 to 2015.  During those four seasons, his showed consistent improvement each season and finished his junior career with 251 points in 279 regular season games, which included back-to-back 39-goal seasons.  He also tallied 58 points in 81 playoff games and was part of the Winterhawks 2013 WHL championship team that advanced to the Memorial Cup final.

The Winnipeg Jets selected De Leo in the fourth round of the 2014 NHL Entry Draft.  After completing his junior career in 2015, De Leo was assigned to the Manitoba Moose, the Jets' top minor league affiliate.  He spent most of his first professional season with the Moose, but was briefly recalled by the Jets on March 20, 2016, to make his NHL debut on March 20 against the Anaheim Ducks.  De Leo played one more game for the Jets before being returned to the AHL.

As an impending restricted free agent following the 2017–18 season, De Leo was traded by the Jets to the Anaheim Ducks in exchange for Nic Kerdiles on June 30, 2018.

Following three years within the Ducks organization, featuring in a lone game each season, De Leo left as a free agent and was signed to a one-year, two-way contract with the New Jersey Devils on July 29, 2021.

After a lone season with the Devils, De Leo as a free agent opted to return to former club, the Anaheim Ducks, in signing a two-year, two-way contract on July 14, 2022.

International play
De Leo was a member of Team USA at the 2015 World Junior Ice Hockey Championships.

Career statistics

Regular season and playoffs

International

References

External links
 

1995 births
Living people
American men's ice hockey centers
Anaheim Ducks players
Manitoba Moose players
New Jersey Devils players
People from La Mirada, California
Portland Winterhawks players
Sportspeople from Los Angeles County, California
Ice hockey players from California
San Diego Gulls (AHL) players
Utica Comets players
Winnipeg Jets draft picks
Winnipeg Jets players